Mount Conway is a mountain located on the border of Alberta and British Columbia. It was named in 1901 by J. Norman Collie after Martin Conway, an alpinist.

See also
List of peaks on the Alberta–British Columbia border
Geography of Alberta
Geography of British Columbia

References

Three-thousanders of Alberta
Three-thousanders of British Columbia
Canadian Rockies
Mountains of Banff National Park